E. robustus  may refer to:
 Epigonus robustus, the robust cardinalfish, a deepwater fish species
 Eremurus robustus, a plant species native to the Tien Shan and Pamir Mountains in central Asia
 Eschrichtius robustus, the gray (or grey) whale, a baleen whale species
 Eudyptes robustus, the Snares penguin, Snares crested penguin or Snares Islands penguin, a penguin species from New Zealand

See also
 Robustus (disambiguation)